Rete may refer to:

Net (device), in Latin
The Network, a former Italian political party
Rete algorithm, an efficient pattern matching algorithm for implementing production rule systems
Part of an astrolabe, a historical astronomical instrument
Net-like anatomic structures: Rete canalis hypoglossi, Rete carpale dorsale, Rete mirabile, Rete ovarii, Rete patellare, Rete pegs and ridges, Rete testes, Rete venosum.

See also
Plexus
Rete Ferroviaria Italiana (RFI), an Italian company, owner of Italy's railway network